Pang Sila Thong is the southwesternmost district (amphoe) of Kamphaeng Phet province, central Thailand.

History
The government split tambons Pang Ta Wai, Hin Dat, and Pho Thong from Khlong Khlung district and created the minor district (king amphoe) Pang Sila Thong on 31 May 1993. It was upgraded to a full district on 11 October 1997.

The name Pang Sila Thong stands for the three tambons comprising the district: Pang for Pang Ta Wai, Sila for Hin Dat and Thong for Pho Thong.

Geography
Neighboring districts are (from the north clockwise): Khlong Lan, Khlong Khlung, Khanu Woralaksaburi of Kamphaeng Phet Province; Mae Wong of Nakhon Sawan province and Umphang of Tak province.

Administration
The district is divided into three subdistricts (tambons), which are further subdivided into 42 villages (mubans). There are no municipal (thesaban) areas. There are three tambon administrative organizations (TAO).

References

External links
amphoe.com

Pang Sila Thong